The Royal New Zealand Navy Band is the musical arm of the Royal New Zealand Navy, serving its musical needs from its headquarters at HMNZS Philomel on Devonport Naval Base, North Shore City, Auckland.

It is a 32-member band that consists of the following ensembles:

Concert Band
Parade Band
Big Band
Jazz Combo
Rock Band
Brass Quintet/Brass Ensemble
Saxophone Quartet
Dixie Band
RNZN Pipes and Drums (club)

History

History of New Zealand Navy Bands
Bands from the Royal Marines have served with the RNZN for over 36 years, with the first band arriving for service with the New Zealand Division of the Royal Navy aboard the HMS Dunedin in 1924. They often also served in military police roled when off duty. During most of the Second World War, the HMS Achilles and HMS Leander maintained marine bands with twelve men each. By 1944, with the decommissioning of Leander from RNZN service and Achilles in refit, only one ship contained a band, with the one it had consisting of fifteen musicians from the RM. Post-1945 there was one Royal Marine detachment and band that served aboard the cruiser HMNZS Bellona that arrived in 1946 for service.

RNZN Band
The detachment left on 27 November 1951, but the band remained in New Zealand to serve as the official RNZN band, being was elevated to the status of a class A band under the command of a commissioned bandmaster the following year. In 1953 the band was transferred to HMNZS Philomel from Bellona and was designated as the New Zealand Station Royal Marines Band under the command of the Naval Officer in Charge, Auckland, becoming the representative band of the RNZN instead of a single ship. Duties included participating in a full-scale version of The Mikado staged by HMNZS Irrirangi, concerts around New Zealand, and the 1953 Presentation of the Queen's Colour of the RNZN by Queen Elizabeth II. During the 1953-54 Royal Tour of New Zealand, the band was posted to the cruiser HMNZS Black Prince that accompanied the Royal Yacht. In 1959 approval was given for the formation of the RNZN Band by the Naval Board to replace the New Zealand Division Marine Band when their service in the country ended. On 20 March 1960, a service was held for the band at the Chapel of St Christopher. A plaque of the crest of the City of Auckland was presented to the bandmaster Lieutenant C.G. McLean. The band was formally discharged from New Zealand service on 6 April 1960. In 2012, it was one of three bands spared in the government cutback on military bands.

The band today

The band maintains a regular schedule of public duties in Auckland, the largest city in the country. Its rehearsal space at HMNZS Philonel is known as the "Narrow Neck". The band has toured and performed at concerts and military tattoos in countries such as South Korea, Japan, Tonga, Canada, the United Kingdom, and the United States.

See also
New Zealand Army Band
Royal Australian Navy Band
Pacific Fleet Band
Singapore Armed Forces Band
Band of the Royal Regiment of New Zealand Artillery

References

Military bands of New Zealand
Royal New Zealand Navy
Organizations established in 1959
1959 establishments in New Zealand
Wind bands